Moshari Al-Thamali (born 10 February 1992) is a Saudi Arabian football player who plays as a midfielder .

Honours

External links
 

Living people
1992 births
People from Taif
Association football midfielders
Saudi Arabian footballers
Wej SC players
Al-Shabab FC (Riyadh) players
Al-Faisaly FC players
Al-Tai FC players
Saudi Professional League players
Saudi First Division League players